Tessa is a feminine given name, sometimes a shortened form of Theresa. It may refer to:

People

 Tessa Albertson (born 1996), American actress
 Tessa Balfour, Countess of Balfour (born 1950), British aristocrat
 Tessa Blanchard (born 1994), American professional wrestler
 Tessa Bonhomme (born 1985), Canadian ice hockey player
 Tessa Brooks (born 1999), American musician and influencer
 Tessa Dahl (born 1957), English author and actress
 Tessa Dare, American novelist
 Tessa de Josselin (born 1989), Australian actress
 Tessa Dunlop (born 1974), British television presenter, radio broadcaster and historian
 Tessa Ferrer (born 1986), American actress
 Tessa Fowler, Vanuatuan politician
 Tessa Ganserer (born 1977), German politician
 Tessa Gräfin von Walderdorff (born 1994), German countess
 Tessa Hadley (born 1956), British author
 Tessa Hofmann (born 1949), German sociologist
 Tessa Howard (born 1999), English field hockey player
 Tessa Humphries, Australian actress
 Tessa Ía (born 1995), Mexican actress
 Tessa James (born 1991), Australian actress
 Tessa Joseph, Indian model and actress
 Tessa Jowell (1947–2018), British Labour politician
 Tessa Kelso, (1863–1933), City librarian, Los Angeles Public Library 1889–1895
 Tessa Kennedy (born 1938), British interior designer
 Tessa Keswick (1942–2022), British policy analyst
 Tessa Lark, American concert violinist
 Tessa Majors (2001–2019), American murder victim
 Tessa Mittelstaedt (born 1974), German actress
 Tessa Munt (born 1959), British politician
 Tessa Niles (born 1961), English singer
 Tessa Parkinson (born 1986), Australian sailor
 Tessa Peake-Jones (born 1957), English actress
 Tessa Pollitt (born 1959), British bass guitarist
 Tessa Prendergast (1928–2001), Jamaican actress, fashion designer, and businesswoman
 Tessa Ross (born 1961), English film producer
 Tessa Sanderson (born 1956), British javelin thrower and heptathlete
 Tessa Schram (born 1988), Dutch actress and film director
 Tessa Simpson (born 1986), American mixed martial artist
 Tessa Tennant (1959–2018), British investment advocate
 Tessa Thompson (born 1983), American actress
 Tessa Violet (born 1990), American musician, singer-songwriter, activist and YouTuber
 Tessa Virtue (born 1989), Canadian ice dancer
 Tessa Wheeler (1893–1936), British archaeologist
 Tessa Worley (born 1989), French skier and military officer
 Tessa Wullaert (born 1993), Belgian footballer
 Tessa Wyatt (born 1948), English actress

Fictional characters
 Tessa Gray, protagonist of The Infernal Devices novel series by Cassandra Clare
 Tessa Noël, in the TV series Highlander: The Series
 Teresa "Tessa" Testarossa, in the multimedia franchise Full Metal Panic!
 Tessa, a character on the TV series Supernatural
 Sage, a Marvel Comics superhero also known as Tessa
 Tessa (Capcom), in the Red Earth video game series
 Tessa, in the Gilbert and Sullivan opera The Gondoliers
 the title character of Tessa (novel), by Margit Sandemo
 the title character of Tessa (play), by Jean Giraudoux
 Tessa Young, Main Character in the movie, After (2019 film) played by Josephine Langford based on the novel written by Anna Todd

See also
 TESSA, the usual abbreviation for a Tax-exempt special savings account, a tax-privileged investment wrapper in the United Kingdom which was replaced by the ISA.
 TESSA, the Los Angeles Public Library online historical collections, after Tessa Kelso, (1863–1933), City librarian, 1889–1895
 Tess (given name)
 

Feminine given names